Tin Tin Deo is an album by guitarist Kenny Burrell recorded in 1977 and released on the Concord Jazz label.

Reception

Allmusic awarded the album 2½ stars with Scott Yanow stating "Tin Tin Deo is a typically tasteful set by guitarist Kenny Burrell. ... Nothing particularly surprising occurs but Burrell is heard throughout in above-average form and this release should please his fans".

Track listing 
 "Tin Tin Deo" (Chano Pozo, Gil Fuller) – 7:17
 "Old Folks" (Willard Robison, Dedette Lee Hill) – 4:35
 "Have You Met Miss Jones?" (Richard Rodgers, Lorenz Hart) – 2:53
 "I Remember You" (Victor Schertzinger, Johnny Mercer) – 5:44
 "Common Ground"  (Kenny Burrell, Warren Stephens) – 4:22
 "If You Could See Me Now" (Tadd Dameron, Carl Sigman) – 6:18
 "I Hadn't Anyone 'til You" (Ray Noble) – 3:52
 "La Petite Mambo" (Erroll Garner) – 4:17

Personnel 
Kenny Burrell – guitar 
Reggie Johnson – bass
Carl Burnett – drums

References 

Kenny Burrell albums
1977 albums
Concord Records albums
Albums produced by Carl Jefferson